Jim Klein is a Los Angeles born, Philadelphia-based, Emmy Award-winning composer, music producer, recording engineer, and songwriter. Klein is best known as the producer and songwriter behind the influential freestyle group Pajama Party, whose albums produced several hit singles. He is also a published author.

Career

Engineering, Production, and Songwriting
After graduating from college, Klein moved to New York City and became a staff engineer at Noise NY recording studios. In the 1980s, Klein worked on numerous major and indie label projects, as well as recordings for film scores. His production and engineering credits during this period include work with Band of Susans, The Raunch Hands, Bernard Edwards, hip-hop pioneers Stetsasonic, TriStar Films, Mantronix, Uproar, Joyce Sims, Miramax Films, Sequal, and other artists at Platinum Island, a multi-room recording studio in New York City. Later, he began to focus on production, songwriting and composition. He was signed to an exclusive songwriting deal with the Famous Music division of Paramount Pictures, where he wrote more than two dozen songs for major label artists including Billy Squier, Brenda K. Starr, Alisha, and Sweet Sensation.

Pajama Party
During the early 1980s, a new style of music developed in the Latino communities of New York City influenced by hip-hop, electro-funk, and a mix of electronic instruments and syncopated percussion. It was in this burgeoning creative scene that Klein made a particular impact. As a producer and songwriter, Klein is best known for his work with the influential freestyle band Pajama Party, which he created in 1987 with songwriting partner Peggy Sendars. He served as producer, engineer, synth and MIDI programmer, instrumentalist, and songwriter on their two Atlantic Records releases. The first of these, Up All Night, produced three Billboard Hot 100 singles, "Yo No Se'," "Over and Over," and "Hide and Seek," as well as several Top 20 dance hits. Today, "Yo No Se" is widely considered to be one of the best and most important songs in the genre and it continues to be re-released on numerous freestyle compilations.

Television and Film Composition
In the 1990s Klein began composing for television and advertisements including major brands like Coca-Cola, Pillsbury, Bacardi, Canon, Glad, Secret, Bounty, AT&T, and McDonald's.  He has written underscores featured on major television programs including the Beijing, Sydney, and Lake Placid Olympic Games, The Oprah Winfrey Show, The Today Show, Behind the Music, Martha Stewart Living and more. Additionally, he worked as a television composer for The Wubbulous World of Dr. Seuss and Nickelodeon's cult-classic The Adventures of Pete & Pete. In 2000, Klein became a composer for ABC's long-running series All My Children. His work on the show earned him eight Daytime Emmy nominations including two nominations for Best Original Song and two wins and four additional nominations for Outstanding Achievement in Music Direction and Composition  Klein continued as a composer for the show until its finale in 2011.

At the same time, he composed several film scores including Miramax's English language release of City on Fire, and composed additional music for other studio feature films, including Paramount's The Weather Man, Millennium's Relative Strangers, Mozart and the Whale, and All I Want.

Solo CD
Klein currently works out of his personal recording space, The Blue Room, outside of Philadelphia and continues to compose for film and television. Klein released his first solo instrumental album in October 2012 entitled The Light at the End.

Drexel University
In 2003, he accepted a faculty position in the Music Industry Program at Drexel University in Philadelphia where he taught courses in music and audio freelancing, music production, and audio engineering. There, he worked with MAD Dragon Records, a student-run record label that is part of Drexel's Music Industry Entities and is distributed nationally by Ryko Distribution, to produce albums for Matt Duke (along with Stewart Lerman and Steuart Smith), Andrew Lipke, and the XYX compilation. Andrew Lipke's song "Untitled Song #1" went on to earn a nomination in the Independent Music Awards. He retired from teaching in 2020.

Book
In 2012, he released a book entitled Welcome to the Jungle: A Success Manual for Music and Audio Freelancers, published by Hal Leonard, a leading publisher of music-related books. According to the publisher, the book seeks to help readers learn about "setting goals, networking, building a portfolio, time management, personal and professional finances, and dealing with the ups and downs of the freelance career".

Awards

Discography

References

American male composers
21st-century American composers
Living people
Record producers from California
Musicians from California
Year of birth missing (living people)
American male songwriters
Songwriters from California
21st-century American male musicians